I'm Not a Robot is a South Korean television series starring Yoo Seung-ho, Chae Soo-bin, and Um Ki-joon. It is written by Kim Sun-mi and directed by Jung Dae-yoon. Producing the series for MBC is May Queen Pictures. It aired from December 6, 2017 to January 25, 2018, on MBC TV's Wednesdays and Thursdays at 21:55 (KST) time slot.

Synopsis
Kim Min-kyu (Yoo Seung-ho) lives a luxurious but isolated life due to a severe allergy to physical contact with other human beings. He develops extreme life-threatening rashes that rapidly spread over his body whenever he makes any form of skin contact. Jo Ji-ah (Chae Soo-bin) is trying to create businesses based on her inventions, notably two networked heart-shaped lamps. 

Min-kyu is the chairman and largest shareholder of KM Financial. He inherited his shares from his parents, who died in a car accident 15 years earlier. He was brought up by his father's friend and colleague, Hwang Do-won (Son Byong-ho), whose son, Hwang Yeo-chul (Kang Ki-young), is the same age as Min-kyu and the CEO of KM Financial.

KM Financial owns the Santa Maria team.  The team is headed by professor Hong Baek-gyun (Um Ki-joon). Professor Hong's team has secretly created an advanced humanoid robot called AG3 (pronounced Aji 3), whose appearance he modeled on his ex-girlfriend Ji-ah (the sound of the robot's name is Ji-a [AJI 3] backwards).

Hwang Yeo-chul and his father Hwang Do-won try to sell the Santa Maria team to Bold Group, owned by a foreign investor, Martin, who has learned about the Aji 3 and wants to use it as a weapon. To convince Kim Min-kyu not to sell the Santa Maria team, Baek-gyun sends the robot to him as a demonstration. Just before the Aji 3 is delivered, the robot short-circuits and Baek-gyun asks Ji-ah to pose as the robot, giving the team time to repair Aji 3. Desperate for the 10 million won payment he is offering her, Ji-ah agrees, and impersonates the robot under the supervision of the Santa Maria team.

Gradually, Min-kyu falls in love with Ji-ah, believing that she is Aji 3. He is disturbed by this, since she is a robot to him, and "reboots" her, erasing the robot's memory. Baek-gyun then replaces Ji-ah with the real Aji 3. Ji-Ah, who has also fallen in love with Min-kyu, leaves the city in an attempt to forget him.

Min-kyu discovers Ji-ah's deception and that she had been pretending to be the robot, and has a violent allergic reaction that nearly kills him. Baek-gyun saves him and Min-kyu angrily breaks off his relationships and friendships with them all for their betrayal and for playing with his feelings. Ji-ah confesses everything to Min-kyu and says she loves him, and they rediscover their love, this time as humans.

Before the reboot, Aji 3 had stored all the video footage and data from the trials with Kim Min-kyu in a secret cache. This cache gets hacked, revealing everything about Min-kyu's illness. The knowledge is used to attempt a take-over of KM Financial, to remove Min-kyu as chairman and complete the sale of the Santa Maria team and Aji 3. Min-kyu manages to thwart the attempt at the last moment. He uncovers evidence that Hwang Do-won and Martin were involved in the murder of Chairman Park, and restores the Aji 3 to the Santa Maria team. 2 years later, the Santa Maria team successfully launches a new robot after changing its appearance, while they, along with Ji-ah, and Min-kyu (after completing the mandatory military service) are happily living their changed lives.

Cast

Main
 Yoo Seung-ho as Kim Min-kyu (28 years old)
 The largest shareholder of the country's largest financial company with an IQ of 159 but is a "human allergy" patient who cannot be in contact with people. Through his company, he owns Aji 3, an android robot which gets sent to him to be tested. When the robot is damaged in an accident, Ji-ah is used to replace Aji 3.  He develops feelings for Ji-ah as the robot and falls in love with her.
 Chae Soo-bin as Jo Ji-ah (28 years old) / Aji 3
 
 Um Ki-joon as Hong Baek-kyun (34 years old)
 Ji-Ah's ex-boyfriend who is a world-renowned genius robotics professor who creates the android named Aji 3 and bases her appearance on Ji-ah.

Supporting

Santa Maria team
 Park Se-wan as "Pi" Angela Jin (30 years old)
 Song Jae-ryong as "Hoktal" Kang Dong-won (33 years old)
 Go Geon-han as "Ssanip" Eddie Park (29 years old)

KM Financial
 Kang Ki-young as Hwang Yoo-chul (28 years old)
 Min-kyu's childhood best friend who betrayed him after Min-kyu's parents' death and, having become the CEO of the company, is now his rival both in business and for the hand of Ri-el.
 Hwang Seung-eon as Ye Ri-el (28 years old)
 Min-kyu's childhood friend and first love. Yoo-chul is in love with her but at first she wants to marry Min-kyu.
 Son Byong-ho as Hwang Do-won
 Yoo-chul's father and the president of the company.
 Lee Byung-joon as Ye Sung-tae
 Ri-el's father and one of the founders of the company.
  as Mr. Yoon
 KM Group Managing Director.

People around Min-kyu
 Um Hyo-sup as Doctor Oh
 Min-kyu's doctor. Having cared for him for fifteen years, he is initially the only other person aware of his condition.
 Lee Ga-ryeong as Young Min-gyoo's mom
  as Butler Sung

People around Ji-ah
  as Jo Jin-bae
 Ji-ah's older brother who is the research team leader of KM Financial.
 Lee Min-ji as Sun-hye (28 years old)
 Ji-ah's friend who is a cafe owner and is a fortune-teller and an expert on romance.
  as Hong-ju (28 years old)
 Ji-ah's schoolmate friend and Jin-bae's wife.
  as Jo Dong-hyun (8 years old)
 Jin-bae and Hong-ju's child.

Extended
  as Miami, a hired thief.
 Choi Dong-gu as Alps

Production
 Dong Ha and Bang Min-ah were first offered the lead roles, but ultimately declined.
 The first script reading of the cast was held on September 27, 2017 at MBC Station in Sangam-dong.

Soundtrack

Part 1

Part 2

Part 3

Part 4

Part 5

Part 6

Ratings
The series was a commercial failure only averaging 3.22% in audience share, and received the lowest viewership ratings in its time-slot throughout its run.

References

External links
  
 
 

MBC TV television dramas
2017 South Korean television series debuts
2018 South Korean television series endings
Korean-language television shows
South Korean romantic comedy television series
South Korean science fiction television series
Television series about robots